Fight Through the Night is the third EP by American metalcore band Phinehas. The EP was self-released by the band on December 16, 2016, and was produced by the band themselves.

Composition
Fight Through the Night features acoustic versions of "Forever West", "Dead Choir", and "Seven" from Till the End. In addition to the acoustic re-recordings, the EP also features three new acoustic tracks: "Cessation of Breathing", "Selah", and "Book of Names". The last track, "Book of Names", features guest vocals from Garrett Russell of Silent Planet.

Track listing

Personnel
Phinehas
 Sean McCulloch – lead vocals, artwork
 Daniel Gailey – guitars, backing vocals, engineering, mixing, mastering
 Bryce Kelley – bass, backing vocals
 Lee Humerian – drums, backing vocals

Additional musicians
 Garrett Russell of Silent Planet – guest vocals on track 6

References

External links
 Fight Through the Night on Last.fm

Phinehas (band) albums
2016 EPs
Self-released EPs